
Gmina Paszowice is a rural area - gmina (administrative district) in Jawor County, Lower Silesian Voivodeship, in south-western Poland.

Neighbouring gminas
Gmina Paszowice is bordered by the town of Jawor and the gminas of Bolków, Dobromierz, Męcinka and Mściwojów.

Villages
The gmina contains the villages of Bolkowice, Grobla, Jakuszowa, Kamienica, Kłonice, Kwietniki, Myślibórz, Nowa Wieś Mała, Nowa Wieś Wielka, Paszowice, Pogwizdów, Siedmica, Sokola, Wiadrów and Zębowice.

Twin towns – sister cities

Gmina Paszowice is twinned with:
 Pakosław, Poland
 Plavy, Czech Republic
 Rapotín, Czech Republic

References

Paszowice
Jawor County